Dan, Danny or Daniel Roman may refer to:

 Dan Roman (footballer, born 1985), Romanian football striker
 Dan Roman (footballer, born 1982), Israeli footballer
 Dan Roman (businessman), Romanian entrepreneur, investor and IT professional
 Daniel Roman (boxer) (born 1990), American boxer
Danny Roman, musician in Sister Double Happiness
Danny Roman, a character in The Negotiator, played by Samuel L. Jackson

See also